Alan Russell Hildebrand (born 1955) is a planetary scientist and Associate Professor in the Department of Geoscience at the University of Calgary. He has specialized in the study of asteroid impact cratering, fireballs and meteorite recovery. His work has shed light on the extinction event caused by the Chicxulub asteroid at the end of the Cretaceous period. Hildebrand is one of the leaders of the Prairie Meteorite Network search project.

Education and career
Hildebrand got a B.S. in Geoscience at The University of New Brunswick in 1977. He got a Ph.D. in Planetary Sciences at The University of Arizona under William Boynton in 1992 with the dissertation "Geochemistry and stratigraphy of the Cretaceous/Tertiary boundary impact ejecta".

In 1978 the Chicxulub Crater in the Yucatan Peninsula of Mexico was discovered by Glen Penfield, but its significance was not recognized at the time.  In 1990, as part of his doctoral program, Hildebrand, working with the father-and-son team of Luis and Walter Alvarez, published controversial articles suggesting that a large impact from an asteroid caused the mass extinction at the end of the Cretaceous period.  The impact site was eventually determined to be at Chicxulub and the extinction it caused became known as the K-T event.

Hildebrand is part of the Geological Survey of Canada,  focusing mainly on the K-T event.

Selected papers
 2000 The fall, recovery, orbit, and composition of the Tagish Lake meteorite: A new type of carbonaceous chondrite, PG Brown, AR Hildebrand, ME Zolensky, M Grady, RN Clayton, ... Science 290 (5490), 320-325

 1992 Tektite-bearing, deep-water clastic unit at the Cretaceous-Tertiary boundary in northeastern Mexico, J Smit, A Montanari, NHM Swinburne, W Alvarez, AR Hildebrand, ... Geology 20 (2), 99-103

 1991  Chicxulub crater: a possible Cretaceous/Tertiary boundary impact crater on the Yucatan Peninsula, Mexico, AR Hildebrand, GT Penfield, DA Kring, M Pilkington, A Camargo Z, ... Geology 19 (9), 867-871

 1990 Proximal Cretaceous-Tertiary boundary impact deposits in the Caribbean, AR Hildebrand, WV Boynton, Science 248 (4957), 843-847

References

External links
 Official home page
 Alan Hildebrand at Google Scholar
 The Day the Mesozoic Died: The Asteroid That Killed the Dinosaurs video

Canadian geologists
Planetary scientists
Academic staff of the University of Calgary
University of Arizona alumni 
University of New Brunswick alumni 
1955 births
Living people